Steven Kenneth Zabriskie (born May 13, 1947 in Palo Alto, California) is a retired American television sports announcer who is best known for calling Major League Baseball and college football.

Announcing career
Zabriskie was a television sports play-by-play announcer for 30 years, during which he was awarded three Television Sports Emmys. Zabriskie served as a TV voice of the New York Mets from 1983 through 1989. Among his broadcast partners for Mets TV broadcasts were Hall of Fame announcer Tim McCarver, former Major League Baseball great Rusty Staub, and Baseball Hall of Famer Ralph Kiner. He also called Boston Red Sox games in 1996 and 1997 and Major League Baseball and college basketball games for ESPN for four seasons.  

He served as a play by play announcer on college football games for ABC Sports between 1976 and 1997. In 1980, he served as ABC's on-field reporter for the 1980 National League Championship Series. In addition to the Mets, Red Sox, ABC, and ESPN, Zabriskie called NFL and college basketball games for CBS Sports and was a play-by-play announcer for The Baseball Network. While working for The Baseball Network in association with ABC, Zabriskie and Tommy Hutton called Game 3 of the 1995 American League Division Series between the Cleveland Indians and Boston Red Sox.

He also broadcast baseball games for the California Angels and covered track-and-field for CBS and various Wide World of Sports events for ABC. On September 2, 1982, Zabriskie and Nellie Briles called a game between the California Angels and Detroit Tigers for the USA Network. And on June 18, 1988, Zabriskie and Kurt Bevacqua called a game between the San Francisco Giants and Cincinnati Reds for NBC.  

Zabriskie retired from broadcasting following the 1997 baseball season and has had a successful career as a registered financial adviser.

Personal
Zabriskie was an all-around athlete in high school earning Scholastic Coach All America honors in football. He attended the University of Houston on a football scholarship and spent a brief time in professional baseball before injuries ended his playing days.  He is a devout Christian.  Steve and his wife, Linda, currently reside in Brentwood, California.  They have seven children and nine grandchildren.

References
http://metwiki.com/wiki/Steve_Zabriskie
http://newyork.mets.mlb.com/nym/history/broadcasters.jsp
http://www.i70baseball.com/tag/steve-zabriskie/

American sports announcers
1947 births
Living people
Major League Baseball broadcasters
National Football League announcers
Boston Red Sox announcers
California Angels announcers
College basketball announcers in the United States
College football announcers
New York Mets announcers
Track and field broadcasters
University of Houston alumni
Sportspeople from Palo Alto, California